Thebes at War (Kefah Teba) is an early novel by the Egyptian writer Naguib Mahfouz. It was originally published in Arabic in 1944. An English translation by Humphrey Davies appeared in 2003. The novel is one of several that Mahfouz wrote at the beginning of his career, with Pharaonic Egypt as their setting. Others in this series of novels include Khufu's Wisdom (1939) and Rhadopis of Nubia (1943). All have been translated into English and appeared in one volume under the title Three Novels of Ancient Egypt (Everyman's Library, 2007).

References

Arabic-language novels
Historical novels
Novels by Naguib Mahfouz
1944 novels
Novels set in ancient Egypt